1133 Lugduna, provisional designation , is a stony Florian asteroid from the inner regions of the asteroid belt, approximately 9.5 kilometers in diameter. It was discovered on 13 September 1929, by Dutch astronomer Hendrik van Gent at the Leiden Southern Station annex to the Union Observatory in Johannesburg, South Africa. The asteroid was named in honor of the city of Leiden in the Netherlands.

Orbit and classification 

Lugduna is a member of the Flora family, a giant asteroid family and the largest family of stony asteroids in the main-belt. It orbits the Sun in the inner main-belt at a distance of 1.8–2.6 AU once every 3 years and 3 months (1,180 days). Its orbit has an eccentricity of 0.19 and an inclination of 5° with respect to the ecliptic.

Its observation arc begins at Johannesburg, three weeks after its official discovery observation.

Physical characteristics 

Both the Tholen classification and PanSTARRS photometric survey characterize Lugduna as a stony S-type asteroid.

Rotation period 

In December 2010, the best-rated rotational lightcurve of Lugduna was obtained from photometric observations by 	 Gordon Gartrelle at the University of North Dakota and at the Badlands Observatory in South Dakota, United States. Analysis of the bimodal lightcurve gave a well-defined rotation period of 5.477 hours with a brightness variation of 0.43 magnitude. Other observations gave a period of 5 and 5.478 hours with an amplitude of 0.33 .

Diameter and albedo 

According to the surveys carried out by the Japanese Akari satellite and the NEOWISE mission of NASA's Wide-field Infrared Survey Explorer, Lugduna measures between 8.275 and 10.47 kilometers in diameter and its surface has an albedo between 0.208 and 0.363.

The Collaborative Asteroid Lightcurve Link assumes an albedo of 0.24 – derived from 8 Flora, the Flora family's largest member and namesake – and calculates a diameter of 9.76 kilometers based on an absolute magnitude of 12.22.

Naming 

This minor planet was named in honor of the Dutch city of Leiden where the Leiden Observatory of Leiden University – parent of the discovering Leiden Southern Station – is located. The asteroid was named by the discoverer and by astronomer Gerrit Pels, who computed the body's orbit. The official naming citation was reviewed by Ingrid van Houten-Groeneveld who was a long-time astronomer at Leiden.

The Latin name Lugdunum Batavorum (or Batavorum Lugdunum) and Academia Lugduno Batava has been used by the city and by the university in official documents. The Latin name also refers to Brittenburg, an ancient Roman ruin located west of Leiden.

Notes

References

External links 
 Asteroid Lightcurve Database (LCDB), query form (info )
 Dictionary of Minor Planet Names, Google books
 Asteroids and comets rotation curves, CdR – Observatoire de Genève, Raoul Behrend
 Discovery Circumstances: Numbered Minor Planets (1)-(5000) – Minor Planet Center
 
 

001133
Discoveries by Hendrik van Gent
Named minor planets
001133
19290913